Callum Chapman-Page (born 6 November 1995) is an English footballer who currently plays for Miami FC in the USL Championship.

Career

Youth
Chapman-Page was released from the Southampton academy at the age of 14, before playing with the Ilkeston's youth team during their 2013–14 season.

United States
Chapman-Page moved to the United States in 2014 to play college soccer at Lubbock Christian University, where he played for two seasons. He didn't play at college in 2016, but instead appeared for NPSL side Corinthians FC of San Antonio, where he scored in the second round of the Lamar Hunt US Open Cup during a 3–1 loss to San Antonio FC.

Chapman-Page transferred to Palm Beach Atlantic University in 2017, where he played for another two seasons and was named to All-SSC Second Team and CoSIDA Academic All-District Team.

During his 2018 college season, Chapman-Page played in the USL PDL with South Georgia Tormenta.

Following college, Chapman-Page signed with NPSL side Miami FC.

On 18 December 2019, Chapman-Page joined USL Championship side FC Tulsa ahead of their 2020 season. He made his debut for Tulsa on 1 August 2020, appearing as a 78th-minute substitute during a 2–1 win over Rio Grande Valley FC.

Chapman-Page returned to Miami FC, now a member of the USL Championship, on 12 January 2021.

Career statistics

Club

References

External links
FC Tulsa bio
USL Championship bio

1995 births
Association football defenders
English expatriate footballers
English footballers
Expatriate soccer players in the United States
FC Tulsa players
Footballers from Nottingham
Guernsey footballers
Living people
Miami FC players
National Premier Soccer League players
Tormenta FC players
USL Championship players
USL League Two players
English expatriate sportspeople in the United States
Lubbock Christian Chaparrals and Lady Chaps
Palm Beach Atlantic Sailfish men's soccer players